Jean-François Heidenreich (March 28, 1811 – March 29, 1872) was a French executioner and the first person to hold the position of Chief Executioner of France.

His father, François-Joseph, had himself been an executioner in Chalon-sur-Saône until 1806.

From 1849 until 1871, Hendenreich served as an executioner of Paris and held this job through the Second French Republic, Second French Empire, and Third French Republic.

In 1871, he became the first sole executioner of France, as local executioners positions were eliminated. He acted briefly in this capacity until his death.

French executioners
1811 births
1872 deaths